Women's Slalom World Cup 1967/1968

Calendar

Note: Round 5/Race 10 was the Olympic event, which counts also for the World Cup. See also 1968 Winter Olympics and Alpine skiing at the 1968 Winter Olympics

Final point standings

In Women's Slalom World Cup 1967/68 the best 3 results count. Deductions are given in brackets.

Women's Slalom Team Results

All points were shown including individual deduction. bold indicate highest score - italics indicate race wins

References
 fis-ski.com

Women's slalom
FIS Alpine Ski World Cup slalom women's discipline titles